Otto Wulff building (Spanish: Edificio Otto Wulff) is a historic building of Buenos Aires. It is located in the corner of Belgrano and Peru, neighborhood of Monserrat.

This building was built on the grounds of an old colonial house known by the name of "La Casa de la Virreina Vieja", which had been owned by the Viceroy Joaquín del Pino and his family. Around the year of 1910 the lands of this property was acquired by the businessman Otto Wulff, who entrusted the Danish architect Morten Rönnow, the construction of a Jugendstil-style building.

References 

Art Nouveau architecture in Buenos Aires
Buildings and structures in Buenos Aires
Residential buildings completed in 1914
Art Nouveau apartment buildings